Young Caesar is an opera written in 1970 by Lou Harrison which depicting the younger years of Roman dictator Julius Caesar, such as his relationship with his first fiancée Cossutia and escape from Rome after disrespecting Dictator Sulla, but it focuses most of all on Caesar's sexual relationship with the Bithynian king Nicomedes IV of Bithynia. Harrison originally designed it as a puppet opera.

See also
 Young Caesar (novel)

References

Compositions by Lou Harrison
Depictions of Julius Caesar in opera
Gay male mass media
Cultural depictions of Cossutia
LGBT-related operas